Top 5 Dead or Alive is the fourth studio album by American hip hop recording artist Jadakiss. The album was released on November 20, 2015, by D-Block Records and Def Jam Recordings. The album features guest appearances from Akon, Future, Jeezy, Lil Wayne, Ne-Yo, Nas, Nipsey Hussle, Styles P, Puff Daddy, Sheek Louch, Swizz Beatz, Young Adz and Young Buck.

Background
In May 2010, he spoke about the progress of the album, saying: "I got about three good ones. Not even recorded. I got probably two verses off each song. Maybe four good ones. [DJ Drama] sent me something. I’m doing real careful selection on production on this project…Even my street joints, even if it’s a symphony. If every verse got 75 curses in it, I want the production to be big…I was gonna switch the name up. I put it on Twitter, I put it on every website you can imagine, and that came back unanimous. So Top Five, Dead or Alive it is, baby…It’s Def Jam, Roc-A-Fella, Ruff Ryders, D-Block, Aphilliates, Green Lantern, a couple of other white guys [releasing it.] You know how this game is. Everybody is in the pot. But it’s enough money for everybody."

In December 2012, he explained that he was halfway done recording the album, saying: "It's coming baby, first quarter. Anywhere, February, March, April... You know, somewhere around there where it feels right,. It's halfway finished now. When I finish this tour, I'll go home and finish the rest of it and then we strategize the marketing plan and get that thing out to the people."

Singles
On October 16, 2015, the album's first single "Jason" featuring Swizz Beatz was released. On October 30, 2015, the album's second single "Ain't Nothin New" featuring Ne-Yo and Nipsey Hussle was released.

Critical reception

Top 5 Dead or Alive received generally positive reviews from music critics. At Metacritic, which assigns a normalized rating out of 100 to reviews from mainstream critics, the album received an average score of 73, based on 5 reviews, which indicates "generally favorable reviews". David Jeffries of AllMusic said, "A top-notch Lil Wayne appearance plus an unofficial Lox reunion with Styles P and Sheek Louch guesting on the LP help put this one through the uprights, giving veteran Jada one of his best and most ambitious showcases to date." Scott Glaysher of HipHopDX said, "After the first initial play through, this album definitely translates as Jadakiss’ most celebratory to date. The beats are more grandiose, less gutter horror story and more hustler's celebration. The whole theme plays out like his very own victory lap."

Commercial performance
In the United States, the album debuted at number 4 on the Billboard 200, selling 60,000 copies in its first week.

Track listing

Notes
  signifies a co-producer

Charts

Weekly charts

Year-end charts

References

2015 albums
Jadakiss albums
Def Jam Recordings albums
D-Block Records albums
Albums produced by Swizz Beatz
Albums produced by Bangladesh (record producer)
Albums produced by Akon
Albums produced by Ty Fyffe
Albums produced by Just Blaze
Albums produced by Mark Batson
Albums produced by Scram Jones